The  was an infantry division of the Imperial Japanese Army. It was formed 12 April 1945 in Shanghai as a class C(hei) security division.

Action
The 161st division was performing a coastal defense duties at Shanghai up to the start Soviet invasion of Manchuria 9 August 1945. Ordered to assist the Kwantung Army together with the 118th division, it left Shanghai by rail 13 August 1945 and reached Nanjing by the time of surrender of Japan 15 August 1945.

The divisional artillery consisted of 12 pieces, namely 75 mm field guns and Type 91 10 cm howitzers.

The division was returned to Shanghai 15 February 1946, and started demobilization 25 February 1946. The troops were sent to Japan through Kagoshima, Fukuoka, Nagato and Sasebo, Nagasaki ports, finishing dissolution 6 September 1946.

See also
 List of Japanese Infantry Divisions

Notes and references
This article incorporates material from Japanese Wikipedia page 第161師団 (日本軍), accessed 14 July 2016
 Madej, W. Victor, Japanese Armed Forces Order of Battle, 1937–1945 [2 vols], Allentown, PA: 1981.

Japanese World War II divisions
Infantry divisions of Japan
Military units and formations established in 1945
Military units and formations disestablished in 1946
1945 establishments in Japan
1946 disestablishments in Japan